The 1996–97 Essex Senior Football League season was the 26th in the history of Essex Senior Football League a football competition in England.

League table

The league featured 13 clubs which competed in the league last season, along with two new clubs:
Ilford, returned to the league system after leaving the Spartan League in 1994
Saffron Walden Town, resigned from the Isthmian League

League table

References

Essex Senior Football League seasons
1996–97 in English football leagues